The United States Agency for Global Media (USAGM), known until 2018 as the Broadcasting Board of Governors (BBG), is an independent agency of the United States government that broadcasts news and information. It is considered an arm of U.S. diplomacy.

The USAGM supervises Voice of America (VOA) and Office of Cuba Broadcasting as well as state-funded Radio Free Europe/Radio Liberty, Radio Free Asia, Middle East Broadcasting Networks and Open Technology Fund. The board of USAGM has an advisory role. It previously supervised USAGM media networks directly, but was replaced with a single appointed chief executive officer (CEO) as part of the National Defense Authorization Act for Fiscal Year 2017, passed in December 2016.

History
The BBG was formed in 1994 with the passing of the International Broadcasting Act. The act established a bipartisan board that consisted of nine voting members, eight of whom were to be appointed by the president for a three–year term. The ninth was the secretary of state, also a political appointee, who would serve as an ex officio board member for the duration of their term as secretary. At this point, BBG was considered a part of the U.S. Information Agency.

The first voting members of the BBG, confirmed on August 11, 1995, were David W. Burke, Ted Kaufman, Tom C. Korologos, Bette Bao Lord, Alberto J. Mora, Cheryl Halpern, Marc Nathanson, and Carl Spielvogel.

On October 1, 1999, the BBG was established as an independent agency by the Foreign Affairs Reform and Restructuring Act of 1998. Despite this change, the act required that the BBG would remain under the supervision of the Inspector General of the State Department and the Foreign Service.

The Agency has five broadcasting entities that were established from 1942 - 2004. The Voice of America (VOA) has been in operation since World War II. William Harlan Hale, a journalist and writer, began the VOA's first radio show by saying "We bring you voices from America. Today, and daily from now on, we shall speak to you about America and the War. The news may be good for us. The news may be bad. But we shall tell you the truth."

Then, in 1950, Radio Free Europe/Radio Liberty (RFE?RL) went on the air. The Office of Cuba Broadcasting (OCB) was started in 1985. Radio Free Asia (RFA) was founded in 1996.

In 2002, BBG launched Radio Sawa, a 24/7 Arabic language radio network that broadcasts news and a mix of Western and Arabic music in the Middle East.

In 2004, Alhurra TV was created as a televised sister network to Radio Sawa and began broadcasting throughout the Middle East. Since its founding, it has established programs such as Al Youm (Today in English), a daily three-hour news program broadcast from five countries on three different continents; and Musawat (Equality in English), a program that focuses on women's issues and rights in the Arab world.

To oversee Arabic broadcasts, the Middle East Broadcasting Network, Inc (MBN) was initiated in 2005. 

Other networks were also expanded under the BBG. Voice of America worked with Radio Free Europe/Radio Liberty to launch Radio Farda, a Persian-language radio program targeting youth. In 2006, VOA initiated TV Ashna, a one-hour televised news broadcast, and Radio Deewa, a daily radio program of sports, music, and local and international news.

In a January 2015 interview with The New York Times, the then newly appointed CEO of the BBG, Andrew Lack, said "We are facing a number of challenges from entities like Russia Today which is out there pushing a point of view, the Islamic State in the Middle East and groups like Boko Haram. But I firmly believe that this agency has a role to play in facing those challenges." 

State Department Spokeswoman Jen Psaki clarified Lack's statement in her January 23 press briefing, saying "would the U.S. Government put those three in the same category? No, we wouldn’t. However, there are concerns...that Russia’s own independent media space is shrinking and the Kremlin continues to apply pressure on the few remaining outlets."

In 2018, the BBG changed its name to the U.S. Agency for Global Media (USAGM). The name change was initiated to help constituents better understand what USAGM does.

The Open Technology Fund (OTF) was launched in 2019, which works to advance internet freedom so USAGM journalists and audiences can have uncensored internet access. Over 2 billion people worldwide use OTF daily.

On January 20, 2021, journalist Kelu Chao was appointed acting CEO of the USAGM, replacing outgoing CEO Michael Pack.

In September 2022, Amanda Bennett, a journalist and Pulitzer Prize-winning author, received bipartisan confirmation by the U.S. Senate to become CEO.

Organization
USAGM is led by a single chief executive officer appointed by the president of the United States and confirmed by the U.S. Senate. Until 2016, it was headed by a bi-partisan board with nine members; eight were appointed by the president with Senate confirmation, and the ninth member ex officio was the Secretary of State. By law, no more than four members could be from the same political party, in an effort to limit partisanship. The president designated one member (other than the Secretary of State) to serve as Chairman. The Board served as a "firewall" against political interference in the journalistic product.

Upon the enactment of the National Defense Authorization Act for Fiscal Year 2017 on 23 December 2016 the agency was placed under the direction of a single CEO. The board, officially renamed as the International Broadcasting Advisory Board, was reduced to five members appointed by the president to serve in an advisory role. Previously appointed board members in excess of five could continue to serve, but would not be replaced when their term expired. Under the 2016 reform legislation, any new agency CEO is to be nominated by the U.S. president and confirmed by the U.S. Senate with authority to select key agency personnel. Former USAGM CEO John F. Lansing, who had been selected and approved in 2015 by the BBG Board holding a Democratic majority during the Obama administration, was not nominated by President Obama nor confirmed by the Republican-controlled U.S. Senate, as this was not required under previous legislation.

In June 2018, President Trump announced his intention to nominate documentary film producer Michael Pack to head the agency. He was confirmed by the Senate two years later, and served from June 5, 2020 until January 20, 2021, when he was asked to resign at the request of newly-inaugurated President Joe Biden. President Biden then appointed Kelu Chao as acting USAGM CEO.

President Biden then nominated Amanda Bennett for CEO. She was received bipartisan confirmation from the U.S. Senate in September 2022 and was sworn into the position in December 2022. 

Past members of the board have included:

Norman J. Pattiz (May 2000 – March 2006) 
 David W. Burke (August 1995 – 2002)
 Ted Kaufman (August 1995 – December 2008)
 Kenneth Y. Tomlinson (August 2002 –)
 Walter Isaacson (July 2010 – January 2012)
 Dana Perino (July 2010 – December 2012)
 Victor Ashe (June 2010 – 2013)
 Michael Lynton (July 2010 – May 2013)
 Susan McCue (July 2010 – May 2014)
In October 2021, the U.S. Government Accountability Office (GAO) published a report about USAGM’s organization.

Outlets

 Voice of America
 Radio Free Europe/Radio Liberty
 Current Time TV
 Radio Free Asia
 Middle East Broadcasting Networks
 Alhurra
 Radio Sawa
 Office of Cuba Broadcasting (Radio y Televisión Martí)

Funding

As a federal agency, USAGM's budget request is part of the president's budget request to Congress.

During the federal funding dispute for the fiscal year 2011, President Barack Obama sided with the BBG agreeing to language that the organization would "expand unrestricted access to information on the Internet." The BBG received $10 million from Congress for the purpose of fighting Internet censorship in China and other countries.

The agency has $2 million earmarked to the 2019–20 Hong Kong protests through the Open Technology Fund. This funding was frozen in June 2020 as China was preparing to introduce a new national security law for Hong Kong.

President Biden's budget request for 2023 includes $840 million for USAGM, which the Agency says will enable them to continue their "vital mission to inform, engage, and connect people around the world in support of freedom and democracy." This is an increase of $29.6 million from the 2022 requested level.

Reception
In February 2010, BBG Executive Director Jeff Trimble collaborated with the National Security Council to publish a VOA statement about Iran's jamming of international satellites. In an email to Foreign Policy magazine, BBG's Public Affairs Director responded to the controversy, stating "the BBG 'firewall' served to protect the integrity and credibility of our journalistic products. An official policy statement by a senior management official of the agency is not a journalistic product."

Later that year, Senator Tom Coburn held up the Obama administration's appointments of Michael P. Meehan and Dana Perino to the board, with the aim of drawing attention to the organization's perceived ineffectiveness, stating in an interview with Foreign Policy magazine: "The BBG is the most worthless organization in the federal government. It's full of people who know nothing about media or foreign policy." Senator Jim DeMint also attempted to use the nominations to force a hearing on the BBG after frustrations with a perceived lack of congressional oversight over the organization. Coburn had written an open letter to then–Senate Minority Leader Mitch McConnell in August 2010 citing "longstanding concerns regarding transparency and effectiveness of our taxpayer funded international broadcasting agencies under the purview of the Broadcasting Board of Governors." Though a report on BBG was eventually given to the Senate Committee on Foreign Relations, Coburn was ultimately unsuccessful in trying to block the appointments to the board.

In July 2016, the chairman of the Broadcasting Board of Governors, Jeff Shell, was denied entry into Russia. Matt Novak, writing for the tech website Gizmodo, referred to the BBG as the "propaganda arm" of the U.S. government and speculated that its alleged role in spreading propaganda on behalf of the U.S. government was the reason Shell was denied entry to Russia.

In 2018, The New York Times reported that the Agency had targeted Americans with Facebook ads for one of its outlets, which would violate the Smith–Mundt Act, a law "to protect Americans from domestic propaganda".

See also
 Title 22 of the Code of Federal Regulations

References

External links

 
 Agency for Global Media in the Federal Register
 Broadcasting Board of Governors in the Federal Register
 U.S. Agency for Global Media on USAspending.gov
 U. S. Government Accountability Office, U.S. Agency for Global Media: Additional Actions Needed to Improve Oversight of Broadcasting Networks"

Government agencies established in 1994
1994 establishments in the United States
Mass media companies established in 1994
United States federal boards, commissions, and committees
Public broadcasting in the United States
Democracy promotion
United States government propaganda organizations